Spanish Harlem may refer to:
Spanish Harlem, a neighborhood in New York City
"Spanish Harlem" (song), a song most famously recorded by Ben E. King

It may also refer to:
Spanish Harlem Orchestra

See also
Harlem (disambiguation)